Traute is a Germanic feminine given name derived from "trud" meaning "strength". The name is now most commonly found in Germany and German-speaking countries. It is often used as a diminutive of the given names ending in -traud, -traut and -trud, such as Waltraud, Edeltraud and Gertrud.

Notable people named Traute
Traute, Princess of Lippe (1925–2023), born Traute Becker, German princess
Traute Carlsen (1882–1968), German actress
Traute Foresti (1915–2015), Austrian poet and actress
Traute Lafrenz (1919–2023), German-American physician and anthroposophist and member of the White Rose anti-Nazi group during World War II
Traute Schäfer (born 1942), German volleyball player

References 

German feminine given names
Feminine given names